Václav Sršeň (7 June 1925 – 30 November 1996) was a football player. He played for Czechoslovakia, representing his country once in 1948. He played for ATK Prague at club level.

Sršeň made his national team debut on 4 July 1948 in a match against Romania in Bucharest. He was the first player from his club to represent the national team.

References

Cited texts

External links
 
 

1925 births
1996 deaths
Czechoslovak footballers
Czechoslovakia international footballers
Dukla Prague footballers
Association football forwards
People from Buštěhrad
Sportspeople from the Central Bohemian Region